Rayamangalam may refer to:
Rayamangalam, Kerala
Rayamangalam, Tamil Nadu